"Doctor's Orders" is the sixteenth episode from the third season of the science fiction television series Star Trek: Enterprise. It's the sixty-eighth episode of the series, first airing on February 18, 2004.

In the 22nd century aboard spaceship NX-01 Enterprise, two crew members Doctor Phlox and Commander T'Pol, guide the ship through an area of dangerous space while the rest of the crew are comatose. The episode is directed by Roxann Dawson with a story by Chris Black, and additional music by Kevin Kiner and Dennis McCarthy.

Plot
While traveling through the Delphic Expanse, Enterprise encounters a trans-dimensional disturbance that lies directly along its time-sensitive course to Azati Prime and the Xindi weapon ("Stratagem").  The crew also learns that the disturbance causes permanent neurological damage to the human neocotex. To avoid a two-week detour, while avoiding the danger to the crew, Doctor Phlox disables the neocortex of all human crewmembers, to survive the four day journey through the disturbance at reduced speed.

While the crew is sedated, Phlox attends to his extended duties aboard the ship, including caring for Captain Archer's dog, Porthos, and thus immune to the effects of the disturbance.  As Phlox does so, he takes the opportunity to compose a letter to an acquaintance of his. Unfortunately Phlox himself begins to become nervous and is easily spooked by irregular ship noises.  In Engineering, falsely perceiving movement, he becomes increasingly tense and nervous.  While investigating a noise he encounters Sub-Commander T'Pol, who is also carrying out duties while the human crew are sedated and, as a Vulcan, has been enjoying the quiet contemplation this situation allows her.  She commits to spending some time with Phlox for a meal.

Phlox's paranoia escalates to delusions. At one point he believes that two Insectoids have somehow boarded the ship. T'Pol insists there is nothing on the sensors, but humors him by helping with a deck-to-deck search, which reveals nothing despite it is clear Phlox is delusional during which Phlox almost shoots Porthos who he forgot to put in his cabin, T'Pol reminds him that it is healthy for his race to use hallucinations to relieve stress.  Phlox disagrees, until he hears and then sees a 'zombie' Ensign Sato and contacts T'Pol and an encounters a awake Captain Archer hallucination.  He finally scans himself after having nearly a dozen hallucinations before and confirms the disturbance is impacting his thinking.  He plans to sedate himself and let T'Pol run the ship, but she acknowledges that she is also becoming disturbed despite not having hallucinations and she refuses to sedate T'Pol.

They discover that the anomaly is expanding and that they are ten weeks, rather than having emerged and half hour ago. Both of them are now easily agitated and distracted but they conclude that engage the warp engine is their only chance to escape, with T'Pol's mind unable to focus on helping as Phlox battles to master the warp drive—he succeeds in getting them free using the warp engines at warp 2 with her help.  That done, he wakes Archer and then he escorts T'Pol to her room, only to find her sleeping there, having been sedated at the same time as the human crew, thus she was never real either.  His T'Pol hallucination disappears, but everyone is now safe.  Phlox sends his unedited letter to his acquaintance, assuring him that he will enjoy the story of his hallucinations.

Production 
"Doctor's Orders" was written by co-executive producer Chris Black. The episode was directed by Roxann Dawson, making it the eighth time she directed an episode of Enterprise. Billingsly and Blalock were the only two actors on set for all seven days of filming.

Reception 

Doctor's Orders was first aired in the United States on UPN on February 18, 2004. 
According to Nielsen Media Research, it received a  2.6/4  rating share among adults.  It had an average of  3.7  million viewers.

Michelle Erica Green of TrekNation called it an "interesting character study" and said "as bottle shows go, it's a beautifully done, satisfying episode, and a nice break from the Xindi action storyline while still moving the ship forward on its quest."
In 2015, Den of Geek in a review of important show characters, noted him as "funny, quirky Phlox"  and pointing out the character introduced audience to the Denobulan species. They recommended the episodes "Dear Doctor", "Stigma", "The Breach", and  "Doctor’s Orders" for the Phlox character.

In 2020, James Whitbrook of Io9 described this episode as a worse version of the Star Trek: Voyager episode "One".

In 2011 Star Trek Magazine rated "Doctor's Orders" 1 out of 5 and named it the worst episode of the season despite the heavy presence of Porthos, he alone could not save this episode.

Home media release 
"Doctor's Orders" was released as part of the season three DVD box set, released in the United States on September 27, 2005. The Blu-ray release of Enterprise was announced in early 2013, and the season three box set was released on January 7, 2014. The Blu-Ray has a surround sound 5.1 DTS-HD Master Audio track for English, as well as German, French, and Japanese audio tracks in Dolby audio.

See also
 "One," an episode of Star Trek: Voyager which earlier used a similar plot.
 The Court Jester, The movie Doctor Phlox watches during movie night.

References

External links
 

Star Trek: Enterprise (season 3) episodes
2004 American television episodes